James Eadie Gordon (23 July 1888 – 22 November 1954) was a Scottish footballer who spent most of his career with Rangers. During the First World War, he was a Sergeant in the Highland Light Infantry.

Career
Born in Saltcoats, Ayrshire, Gordon played with juvenile side Thornwood Athletic and junior club Renfrew Victoria (being selected for the Scotland team at that level) before joining Rangers during the 1906–07 season. He stayed with the Ibrox club until 1920, playing 315 Scottish Football League games and winning five championships in the process (388 appearances including all cups of the time). Versatile enough to play in any position on the pitch, he did just that playing in goals, in defence, in midfield and up front for Rangers.

His favoured role was right-half and this was the position he occupied most during his international career with the Scotland national team, which extended to ten caps between 1912 and 1920. Gordon also represented the Scottish League XI 14 times, played in four unofficial wartime internationals and took part in an unofficial Scottish tour of North America in 1921.

Gordon "guested" for Fulham and Hearts during World War I and joined Dunfermline Athletic when he finally left Rangers in 1920. After his playing retirement, he and former Rangers colleague Jimmy Galt ran a series of billiard halls. He was included in the Rangers F.C. Hall of Fame on 5 February 2007.

See also
List of Scotland national football team captains
List of Scotland wartime international footballers

References

External links
Rangers Hall of Fame profile

1888 births
1954 deaths
Scottish military personnel
Scottish footballers
Scotland international footballers
Scotland wartime international footballers
Rangers F.C. players
Dunfermline Athletic F.C. players
Highland Light Infantry soldiers
British Army personnel of World War I
People from Saltcoats
Scottish Football League players
Scottish Football League representative players
Footballers from North Ayrshire
Fulham F.C. wartime guest players
Heart of Midlothian F.C. wartime guest players
Association football midfielders
Association football utility players
Scottish Junior Football Association players
Scotland junior international footballers
Renfrew Victoria F.C. players